Grande Rivière du Nord is a small coastal river that has its mouth in the Atlantic Ocean located in the Nord department of Haiti.

Geography
This river has its source in the Massif du Nord, which runs through the town of Grande-Rivière-du-Nord.

Hydrology
The watershed of the Great North River is 640 km2, the average rate or modulus of 5.4 m³ ⋅ / s and the flow coefficient of 20.5%.

References

Rivers of Haiti